Fjallavatn is the second largest lake in the Faroe Islands. It is situated on the island of Vágar and its size is 1 km2.

References 
Lakes of the Faroe Islands
Vágar